The Girl in the Orange Dress is a 2018 Filipino romantic comedy film directed by Jay Abello and starring Jericho Rosales and Jessy Mendiola. It serves as an official entry to the 2018 Metro Manila Film Festival.

Synopsis 
After a night of partying, Anna, a young woman, wakes up in the bed of a famous movie star.

Cast

Main characters 
 Jericho Rosales as Rye
 Jessy Mendiola as Anna

Supporting characters 
 Ria Atayde as Kakai
 Sheena Halili as Sasha
 Hannah Ledesma as Denise
 Cai Cortez as Rachel
 Thou Reyes as Gino
 Nico Antonio as Julio
 Nicco Manalo as Eric
 Via Antonio as Carol
 Juan Miguel Severo as Macky
 Maika Rivera as Honey
 Jervi Ryan "KaladKaren Davila" Li as Ogie
 Anna Luna as Karen Villegas (Anna's Sister)
 Cheska Iñigo as Betty (Anna's Friend)
 Brian Sy as Jonathan

Special participation 
 Derek Ramsay as Ethan
 Tuesday Vargas as Liberty Su
 Maxene Magalona as Martha
 Jennylyn Mercado as Agatha
 Luis Manzano as Eric Dela Cruz
 Boy Abunda as Joey Marasigan

Theme song
 "We & Us” by Moira Dela Torre

References

External links 
 

2018 films
Star Cinema films
Filipino-language films
Philippine romantic fantasy films
Philippine romantic comedy films
2018 romantic comedy films
2010s romantic fantasy films
Films directed by Jay Abello